This is the results breakdown of the local elections held in Galicia on 13 June 1999. The following tables show detailed results in the autonomous community's most populous municipalities, sorted alphabetically.

Overall

City control
The following table lists party control in the most populous municipalities, including provincial capitals (shown in bold). Gains for a party are displayed with the cell's background shaded in that party's colour.

Municipalities

A Coruña
Population: 243,134

Ferrol
Population: 82,548

Lugo
Population: 86,620

Ourense
Population: 107,965

Pontevedra
Population: 73,871

Santiago de Compostela
Population: 93,584

Vigo
Population: 283,110

References

Galicia
1999